Esufaly Goolamhusen Adamaly was a Bohra merchant and legislator in Ceylon. 

Adamaly immigrated to Ceylon from India became a successful merchant. His firm E. G. Adamaly & Co. was at the time the largest importer of rice, sugar, flour, matches, kerosene and grain. In 1905, the firm imported 400,000 bags of rice per year and owned extensive property in Colombo, Kandy, and Nuwara Eliya including the  Fairfield Estate of Rubber and Tea in Avissaewella. He was appointed by the Governor of Ceylon as the Indian unofficial member of Legislative Council of Ceylon in 1921. His son Kurbanhusen Adamaly also served as an appointed member of the Senate of Ceylon.

References 

Date of birth missing
Sri Lankan businesspeople
Dawoodi Bohras
Members of the Legislative Council of Ceylon
Sri Lankan people of Indian descent